The 1942–43 Texas Longhorns men's basketball team represented The University of Texas at Austin in intercollegiate basketball competition during the 1942–43 season. The Longhorns were led by first-year head coach H. C. "Bully" Gilstrap. The team finished the season with a 19–7 overall record and a 9–3 record in Southwest Conference play to win a share of the SWC championship. Texas advanced to the NCAA tournament for the second time, recording its first-ever Final Four appearance.

Schedule and results

References 

Texas Longhorns men's basketball seasons
Texas
NCAA Division I men's basketball tournament Final Four seasons
Texas
Texas Longhorns Basketball Team
Texas Longhorns Basketball Team